Bodle is a surname. Notable people with the surname include:

Bruce Bodle (1935–2008), New Zealand cricketer
Charles Bodle (1788–1835), American politician 
Harold Bodle (1920–2005), British footballer 
Richard Bodle (1816–1869), British cricketer